Zaheen Tahira (1931 – 9 July 2019) was a Pakistani film and television actress, producer and director. She also worked for Radio Pakistan and on stage.

Early life 
She was born in 1931 in Lucknow, India (according to some sources, she was born in 1935 in Lucknow, British India).

Career
She is considered to be one of the most senior and veteran actresses in Pakistan television history. She dominated the TV screens in the late 1960s, 1970s and 1980s by portraying strong characters mainly on Pakistan Television Corporation (PTV) Karachi centre. She has appeared in over 700 drama serials in lead and supporting roles. She also produced and directed a few television series. She appeared in plays mostly on private channels. She played the lead role in Pakistan's record breaking serial Khuda Ki Basti by Shaukat Siddiqui.

In 2013, she received the Tamgha-e-Imtiaz (Medal of Distinction) by the President of Pakistan in recognition of her work in the Pakistani entertainment industry.

Illness and death 
Tahira was admitted to Aga Khan University Hospital in Karachi after suffering a major cardiac arrest on 23 June 2019. On 27 June 2019 she was shifted to the CCU from ICU. Her son Kamran Khan said that "Mum is hospitalized. she is getting better now, By evening they will remove the ventilator." Her grandson Danial Shahzad Khan said that  "Zaheen Tahira is very much alive and is currently admitted in the coronary care unit."

Zaheen Tahira died in Karachi on 9 July 2019 around 9:30 am.

Filmography

Awards and recognition

References

External links
 

1931 births
2019 deaths
Pakistani television actresses
Hum Award winners
20th-century Pakistani actresses
21st-century Pakistani actresses
Actresses from Karachi
Muhajir people
PTV Award winners
Recipients of Tamgha-e-Imtiaz